Kirloskar Brothers Limited (KBL) is a pump manufacturing company involved in engineering and manufacture of systems for fluid management. Established in 1888 in Kirloskarvadi and incorporated in 1920, KBL is the flagship company of the $2.5 billion Kirloskar Group. The market leader in fluid management, KBL provides fluid management solutions for large infrastructure projects in the areas of water supply, power plants, irrigation, oil & gas and marine & defence. The company engineers and manufactures industrial & petrochemical, agriculture & domestic pumps, valves and hydro turbines. In 2003 KBL acquired SPP Pumps (UK), United Kingdom and established SPP INC, Atlanta, USA, as a wholly owned subsidiary of SPP, UK and expanded its international presence. In 2007, Kirloskar Brothers International B.V., The Netherlands and Kirloskar Brothers (Thailand) Ltd, a wholly owned subsidiary in Thailand were incorporated. In 2008, KBL incorporated Kirloskar Pompen B.V. which acquired Rodelta Pumps International B.V. in 2015 in The Netherlands. In 2010 KBL acquired Braybar Pumps, South Africa and in 2012 it established a manufacturing facility in Egypt as SPP MENA. KBL has joint venture cooperation with Ebara, Japan since 1988 under Kirloskar Ebara Pumps Ltd. Kirloskar is in licensee agreement with Corrocoat, UK since 2006 called Kirloskar corrocoat Pvt.Ltd. KBL acquired The Kolhapur Steel Limited in 2007, Hematic Motors in 2010.

Research and development
KBL invests in resources on research and engineering. This includes sump model studies, intake studies analysis using computational fluid dynamic techniques, surge analysis, cavitation studies, seismic analysis, vibration analysis, and transient analysis. The company has 17 patents since 2006 and presents various technical papers to ASME as well as at Texas A&M University in the United States.

Achievements

 KBL created the world's largest irrigation project at the time (March 2007). This was the Narmada Project implemented on behalf of the Gujarat Government.
 Kirloskar Brothers has been closely associated with India's nuclear program and has made canned motor pumps for pumping heavy water which are deployed at Indian Nuclear Power Plants.
 KBL is also the first Indian company to get Factory Mutual certification for its valves.
 Kirloskar Brothers has a presence in over 80 countries
 Kirloskar Brothers Ltd is one of the oldest companies in India and was the first engineering company in India to sell products under an Indian brand in the late 1880s.
 Kirloskar Brothers Ltd received the ASME N-STAMP in 2012 and is the first Indian company in rotating equipment to receive this as well as amongst a few companies in the world to have this accreditation
 Kirloskar Brothers Ltd is also one of the first pump companies to have an all women operated and managed manufacturing plant at Coimbatore, which is the second largest metropolitan city of state Tamil Nadu in India 
 KBL also aided the Thai govt in the rescue operation in saving the football team that were trapped in the water filled cave of July month of 2018.

References

External links
 Kirloskar Pumps
 Kirloskar Brothers Limited on Yahoo! Finance

Manufacturing companies established in 1888
Manufacturing companies based in Pune
Pump manufacturers
Indian companies established in 1888
Companies listed on the National Stock Exchange of India
Companies listed on the Bombay Stock Exchange
Indian companies established in 1920